Edgley may refer to:

Edgley International, theatre and concert promotions company from Australia, first started in the 1930s
Edgley Optica, British light aircraft designed for observation work, intended as a low-cost alternative to helicopters
Gigi Edgley (born 1977), Australian actress and recording artist
Harry Edgley (1891–1966), English footballer
Leslie Edgley (1912–2002), mystery fiction writer
Mark Edgley Smith (born 1955), British composer
Richard C. Edgley (born 1936), the first counselor in the presiding bishopric of The Church of Jesus Christ of Latter-day Saints since 1995